Miss Grand Thailand 2022 is the ninth edition of the Miss Grand Thailand beauty contest, held on 30 April 2022 at Show DC Hall in Bangkok, Thailand. The coronation was initially scheduled in August 2021, however, due to the COVID-19 pandemic, the event was rescheduled twice, first in late-2021, and later to 2022. At the end of the event, the appointed Miss Grand Thailand 2021, Indy Johnson of Pathum Thani, crowned her successor, Engfa Waraha of Bangkok, a former contestant on the 2018/2019 The Voice Thailand, making her the first representative of the capital city to win the title. Engfa represented the country at Miss Grand International 2022, where she placed as 1st Runner-Up.

Seventy-seven delegates, chosen by various provincial licensees through their provincial pageants,  competed for the national title. The event was hosted by Matthew Deane and was beamed live to a virtual audience worldwide via the pageant YouTube channel, named GrandTV.

Background

Location and date

The ninth edition of the Miss Grand Thailand beauty contest was originally scheduled to be held on 21 August 2021, however, the rising cases caused by SARS-CoV-2 Delta variant in Thailand during Mid-2021 caused the organizer to postpone the event to 11 September 2021 and eventually announce to skip the event to be arranged in April 2022 instead. The press conference of the contest was conducted at the PM Center office on 17 January, in which Khon Kaen was announced as the preliminary host province for the swimsuit contest, the darling of the host competition as well as all other ancillary activities during 10–21 April, and the Show DC Hall of Bangkok will be served as the venue for the national costume parade, preliminary competition, and the grand final coronation. Moreover, in the same event, the former Miss Grand Thailand Arayha Suparurk was authorized as the general director of the pageant, replacing , who served in such a position during 2019–2021.

On 14 February 2021, the pageant organizer Miss Grand International Co., Ltd. together with the Thai Fabric Promotion Association of Khon Kaen Province, Khon Kaen Tourist Business Association, and Khon Kaen Chamber of Commerce, signed a memorandum of understanding (MOU) to host the Miss Grand Thailand 2022 contest in Khon Kaen under the concept of ′The Iconic of Khon Kaen′ aiming to promote the provincial tourism industry during the Songkran Festival, the traditional Thai New Year, held during 8–15 April at Sri Chan Road and Kaen Nakhon Lake in the center of Khon Kaen city.

Selection of participants
Seventy-seven national delegates were selected through the provincial pageants, 52 events in total, held in 44 provinces by several local organizers, who in some cases are responsible for more than one province. The provincial winners hold the title "Miss Grand (Province)" for the year of their reign. Of which, one contestant was replaced after the original contestant; Aksarapak Chaiammart, who had been crowned Miss Grand Nakhon Sawan 2022, was due to represent the province but the health problem had to resign the title and was replaced by the first runner-up Isaree Therakoonpipat.

Competition

Pre-pageant activities

Pre-pageant voting
Before the start of the national pageant, public online voting was held on the pageants' official Facebook page, aiming to determine the top 2 winners of each region groups, 8 in total. The result found that the candidates of Chiang Mai, Lampang, Nakhon Pathom, Nonthaburi, Amnat Charoen, Udon Thani, Kanchanaburi, and Surat Thani, were announced as the winner of the first challenging event. All of them received the organizer's special gift set as a reward.

Later in late April 2022, two weeks before the beginning of the pageant boot camp, the second public online voting challenge was additionally launched to select 10 winners, regardless of the geographical region, for joining a special meeting with the president of the contest Nawat Itsaragrisil on 8 March, the voting result is shown below;

Ancillary activities
In addition to the sub-contests and challenge events, several ancillary events were programmed to be arranged in this edition, such as a sponsor photo shoot, sightseeing, as well as doing charitable events. One of which, Miss Grand Land Road –  a public Marathon charitable event, co-organized by the Student Union of Khon Kaen University (KKUSU) and the Miss Grand International Limited, originally scheduled to happen on 10 April at Khon Kaen University, was entirely canceled due to the serious situation of the COVID-19 pandemic in the preliminary host province.

On 5 April 14 national entrances were favorably chosen by Ramsita the main sponsor of the contest, to take the photo shoot used for their commercial purposes, the provinces of those eligible candidates is listed below.

 
 
 
 
 

 
 
 
 
 

 
 
 
 

On the official welcome ceremony night held at Show DC Hall on 9 April, in addition to publicizing the competition details, the event also featured the formal Thai national costume and the creative swimsuit fashion shows worn by seventy-seven national aspirants. Moreover, the presentation of the modern Thai silk dress by the mentioned candidates was also founded at the "Gala Night Thai Silk", arranged in Avani Khon Kaen Hotel & Convention Centre on the following 11 March. In partnership with Netflix, the pageant contents will also be accessible on such a platform; some candidates were elected to shoot the advertising media, namely the representative of Ang Thong, Chumphon, and Phuket.

Sub-contests and special awards

Miss Grand Morlam contest

The preliminary round of the Miss Grand Morlam Rising Star was held on 6 April 2022 at Hotel Swissôtel Bangkok Ratchada, in which the panel of judges affiliated with the Mor lam music band  "Prathom Bunterng Silp" select the finalists based on their Mor lam-related performances. Fifty out of the seventy-seven national finalists voluntarily took part in this sub-contest, only 3 candidates were classified for the further round; including Engfa Waraha of Bangkok, Mueanphan Kunket of Prachinburi, and Kittiyaporn Lanont of Sisaket. The event was hosted by Sakul Limpapanon,  2018.

The judging panel of the event includes;

 Phakdee Pollam – Prathom Bunterng Silp band leader
 Ukondetch Patchim – Prathom Bunterng Silp performer
 Top Thanachai – Prathom Bunterng Silp performer
 Torchok Sirichai – Prathom Bunterng Silp performer
 Mack Natnarin – Prathom Bunterng Silp MC
 Teerawat Jiangkam – Prathom Bunterng Silp performance trainer
 Hotty Thaweesak – Prathom Bunterng Silp performer
 Sukanya Lunthaisong – Prathom Bunterng Silp performer
 Krissaneerat Saentrong – Prathom Bunterng Silp performer
 Nawat Itsaragrisil – Miss Grand International Ltd. president

The final round of the contest was organized with the full show of Prathom Bunterng Silp band on 26 April at Show DC Hall in Huai Khwang, also hosted by "Sakul Limpapanon" and was beamed live on Facebook as a pay-to-access event. All three finalist of the contest performed their Morlam skill featuring the main artist of the band, however, all these finalists was later named the winners on the national coronation night on 30 April, and receive the prize of ฿50,000 Baht cash each (approx. US$1,500). The winner of the Miss Grand Morlam contest has to sign the contract to work as the Mor lam performer for the aforementioned music band for 1 year.

The final competition result is shown below;

Miss Pond's Fresh Face challenge

The Miss Pond's Fresh Face challenging event was held by the Unilever Thailand on 6 April 2022 at Hotel Swissôtel Bangkok Ratchada, in which the 77 aspirants of the national tilt appeared without makeup for the judging for the Miss Pond's Fresh Face title. "Amanda Jensen" of Phuket was later announced the challenging winner on the grand coronational round at Show DC Hall on 30 April.

The judging panel of the event includes;
 Chatthaporn Wongkhempet – Pond's Thailand brand manager
 Kanlaya Kunathip – Research and development senior manager of Unilever Thailand
 Patteerat Laemluang – actor and social media influencer
 Arayha Suparurk – Miss Grand Thailand general director

The winner of the Miss Pond's Fresh Face challenge received the prize of ฿100,000 Baht cash (approx. US$3,000) and has to sign a 1-year contract to work as the brand ambassador for Pond's Thailand.

Isan Costume competition

Under the collaboration between Miss Grand International Limited and Khon Kaen University, the Isan creative costume competition was held on the outdoor stage of the Art and Culture Museum in Khon Kaen University on 13 March, in which 77 national candidates competed in creative style Isan costumes sewed by different local designers. The representative of Surin, Pa-ornrat Pinmueang, was named the winner at the end of the event and received cash of ฿100,000 Baht (approx. US$3,000) as a prize. Pinmueang wore the Galemore witch apparel of Kuy people, an indigenous ethnic group in Surin province. The event was hosted by Arthit Mekarkard Mister National Thailand 2016 and Sakul Limpapanon Mister Eco International Thailand 2018.

The judging panel includes;

 Charnchai Panthongwiriyakul – The President of Khon Kaen University 
 Niyom Wongphongkham – Vice President for Arts & Culture and Creative Economy, Khon Kaen University
 Boonyarit Panitrungreaung – Deputy Mayor of Khon Kaen Municipality
 Sunisa Suwannawong – Hotel Manager Avani Khon Kaen Hotel & Convention Centre
 Pratchaya Tongtangthai – Khon Kaen Provincial Council Member
 Suraprapa Chantarapapaporn – Aura Rich (Thailand) Co., Ltd. Director
 Chidchonlatarn Chaisingha – Krit Consultant Co., Ltd. Chairman
 Sirin Prasertsang – Chaonang (Thailand) Co., Ltd. Chairman's Secretary
 Saruta Khankaew – Royal Gateway Co., Ltd. Senior Brand Executive
 Jirapun Watcharajindapat – Jirapun Together Co., Ltd. Manager

The competition result is shown below;

Swimsuit contest

The swimsuit contest of the Miss Grand Thailand 2022 pageant was done on 16 April 2022, hosted by Pamela Pasinetti , and was beamed live to a virtual audience via the official YouTube channel, named GrandTV, and its Facebook Live coverage from the Khon Kaen Hall of CentralPlaza Khon Kaen in Khon Kaen.  Each national delegate wore the same type of swimsuit designed by the organizer and paraded one by one in front of the panel of judges. The score for this event, together with the swimsuit section on the preliminary stage on 27 April was used to determine the "Best in Swimsuit" winner, which was later announced on the national final stage on 30 April, the representative of Chiang Mai, Atita Payak, is the conqueror of such.

In addition to searching for the aforementioned title, the event was also used to determine the first 8 finalists who will advance to compete for the "Devonte Men's Women Style" title, the winner of which will obtain cash of ฿500,000 Baht (approx. USD$15,000) as a prize and has to sign a 1-year contract to serve as the ambassador for the brand.

The judging panel includes;
 Nathapat Moonlao –  Host province license holder for Miss Grand Thailand 2022
 Thanatch Harinthajinda –  Host province license holder for Miss Grand Thailand 2022
 Kittikun Tansuhat – Devonte Brand Ambassador
 Nawat Itsaragrisil – The president of Miss Grand International Limited

Miss Darling of Khon Kaen contest

The competition for the annual special title of "Miss Darling of Khon Kaen" was held on 17 April at Khon Kaen Hall of CentralPlaza Khon Kaen, and beamed live worldwide to a virtual audience via the organizer YouTube channel, aiming to determine the most favorite candidate for the pageant host province. The event was hosted by Arthit Mekakard, Mister National Thailand 2016, and Pamela Pasinetti . According to all previous editions of Miss Grand Thailand, the winners of "Miss Darling of the Host province" always secure their position among the top 5 finalists at the final national contest.

The contestants were classified under four geographical regions namely; northern, northeastern, central, and southern, regardless of the government administrative regions, each group consisted of 17, 20, 22, and 18 provinces, respectively. Each delegate was introduced in the first opening parade with the same style of simple Isan costume and then competed in the evening gown round. Five contestants with the highest accumulation points from each region advanced to the top 20 round, and only two delegates of each regional group qualified for the further round. The winner of the fast track (automatic advancement) title, "Miss G-Rich", which was chosen by one of the event's sponsors, as well as the winner of "Miss Popularity", were automatically placed among the top 10 finalists, where all entrants were asked the same question about a Thai politician recently accused of sexual harassment. After the first Q&A round, the judges then selected the top five candidates regardless of the regional groups to compete in the final question-and-answer portion which all top 5 finalists were questioned about the problem related to the Khon Kaen local government administration and other national political issues. At the end of the event, a 21-year-old Thai-Iranian, "Ornpreeya Nesa Mahmoodi" of Ang Thong province was named the winner and received cash of ฿50,000 Baht as a prize, and the first runner-up is belonging to the representative of Bangkok "Engfa Waraha" who received a prize of ฿20,0000 Baht for such position while all other three of top 5 finalists from Nan, Khon Kaen and Chonburi were announced the second runners-up and obtained cash of ฿10,0000 Baht each.

The judging panel includes;

 Boonyarit Panitrungreaung – Deputy Mayor of Khon Kaen Municipality
 Sunisa Suwannawong – Hotel Manager Avani Khon Kaen Hotel & Convention Centre
 Nisa Chapupuang – CentralPlaza Khon Kaen general manager
 Prasit Tongtangthai – Khon Kaen Provincial Council Member
 Yupparat Duangdeethaweesup – President of the Thai Cloth Promotion Association, Khon Kaen
 Nantiya Sirikarnthananan – President of Rotary Club of Friendship, Khon Kaen
 Supasara Siriboonrat – President of the Association of Women Businessmen and Professionals, Khon Kaen Province
 Dampawan Lajoy – Vice-chairman of the Federation of Thai Industries, Khon Kaen Province
 Patima Laochai – Chairman of the Maha Sarakham Chamber of Commerce
 Nipaporn Theerakanok – managing director of Nissan KKT Khon Kaen Co., Ltd.
 Suraprapa Chantarapapaporn – Director of Aura Rich (Thailand) Co., Ltd. 
 Chidchonlatarn Chaisingha – Chairperson of Krit Consultant Co., Ltd. 
 Thunthita Sapsiritarakul – Chairperson of Chaonang (Thailand) Co., Ltd. 
 Saruta Khankaew – Royal Gateway Co., Ltd. Senior Brand Executive
 Jirapun Watcharajindapat – Manager of Jirapun Together Co., Ltd. 
 Saranon Paisarnphan – Ida Clinic Manager
 Methawee Sornprasom – Ida Clinic Manager
 Panin Kitjunya – Warasiri Real Estate Project Manager
 Jintana Feuanthaisong – Manager of La Villa Co., Ltd. 

In addition to crown the main title, the winners of other special awards given by the local organizer were also determined, as listed below.
 Miss Popularity – determined by the public vote in the event, the winner of which, "Engfa Waraha" of Bangkok, was automatically qualified for the top 10 finalists of the contest.
 Miss G-Rich – favorably chosen by the event sponsor, the title recipient "Amanda Jensen" of Phuket, was also automatically placed among the top 10 finalists at the event.
 Miss Healthy No Calorie – won by "Charlotte Austin" of Chumphon who received cash of ฿10,000 Baht as a prize (approx. USD$300).
 Darling of Avila – obtained by "Sulax Siriphattharaphong" of Surat Thani, who carried out with the prize of ฿10,000 Baht.
 Darling of Avila Manager – the winner of which, "Suphatra Kliangprom" of Phrae, also received a cash of ฿10,000 Baht.

The competition results summary is shown in the diagram below.

Wink White's Challenge 
Color keys

Devonte's Challenge

Devonte's Men was one of the sponsors of 2022 Miss Grand Thailand pageant. As a representative of the company, "Kittikun Tansuhat" attended the swimsuit contest held at Khon Kaen Hall of CentralPlaza Khon Kaen on 16 April, to determine 8 eligible candidates who later took part in several challenger events together with other 2 finalists selected through the public online voting. The challenge events aimed to select the winner who will serve as its brand ambassador for 1 year. The representative of Phuket, Amanda Jensen, was named the challenging winner on the final night competition on 30 April at Show DC Hall, Bangkok, and received 500,000 Baht (approx. USD$15,000) in cash as a reward.

The company also held another challenge event on 18 April where all contestants were randomly divided into 10 groups of 7 each, then all groups were assigned to take the photoshoot with the company representative. The final result found that group 8 which consisted of the representatives from Chiang Mai, Chiang Rai, Kamphaeng Phet, Nakhon Phanom, Phrae, Saraburi and Tak provinces, was selected as the winner and received 70,000 baht in cash as a reward.

In addition to the aforementioned challenges, Devonte and the pageant organizer also provided the pocket money to 9 candidates chosen by a randomly drawn, as well as offered a 1-day special tour within the host province to other 7 candidates, all chosen delegates and the summary of the challenger selective system are shown below.

Best National Costume Parade
Contestants from all 77 provinces wore outfits representing the best identity of their home provinces in the "national costume" round of the Miss Grand Thailand 2022 pageant held on 24 April night at the Show DC Hall in Huai Khwang. The event was also beamed live to a virtual audience via the pageant's official YouTube channel, hosted by Pamela Pasinetti  and Sakul Limpapanon, Mister Eco International Thailand 2018. For the adjudication process, 25 of 50 finalist costumes will be determined by popular choice through Instagram and Facebook voting from 24 to 27 April, while the remaining will be selected by the judges. Then the second selection process will be operated to select the last 25 costumes, 12 by public voting and the others by a panel of judges. Five winning costumes will be announced on the grand final round on 30 April and rewarded a ฿100,000 Baht cash each, with the fourteen runners-up will receive 30,000 baht each.

The competition result is shown below;

Featured costumes

Miss Popular Vote

The winner of the "Miss Popular Vote" was determined via a public paid voting on the official Facebook page of the pageant (฿100 Baht – approx. USD$3 – for each point) during the period of the pageant camp. The representative of Nonthaburi, Thiphayaporn Phomraj, was named the winner and automatically qualified for the top 10 finalists at the grand final round, held on 30 April at Show DC Hall of Bangkok.

Miss Grand Best Seller 
Color keys

Other awards 
The following list is the special awards provided in the Miss Grand Thailand 2022, the winners of such were either favorably or randomly selected by the pageant sponsors, no physical contest was being held.

Main pageant

Prelimiary competition
The preliminary round of the Miss Grand Thailand 2022 pageant, which is usually used to determine the top 20 finalists, will happen on 27 April, at Show DC Hall, Bangkok. In which, all 77 contestants will compete in swimwear and evening gowns in front of a panel of preliminary judges. The scores from the preliminary event, together with a closed-door interview portion, the swimsuit competition as well as the scoring via all ancillary events, will determine the top 20 finalists who will be announced on the grand final stage on 30 April.

Grand final coronation
The winner of the contest will receive ฿1.2 million baht (approx. USD$ 36,783, to date) in cash and a condominium worth 1.8 million baht as prizes. Meanwhile, the 1st–4th runners-up will be offered ฿7.0, 6.0, 5.5, and 5.0 hundred thousand baht cash, respectively. Such the winner, as well as all runners-up, have to sign a contract to work with the company for 1 year. In addition, the remaining of the 10 finalists will receive a prize of ฿100,000 baht each, the first year that the organizers will award the prize to top 10 finalists.

Sponsorship
The following list is the main sponsorship for the Miss Grand Thailand 2022 pageant.

 A Best Estate Co., Ltd. – a Bangkok-based real estate development company.
 AJ Advance Pub Co., Ltd. – a Thai Stock Exchange-listed company that operated in procurement business sector and electrical devices distribution.
 Nova Organic Pub Co., Ltd. – a Thai Stock Exchange-listed company that operated in the personal care and pharmaceuticals sector.
 PM Gems and Diamond – a Thai jewellery manufacturer company.
 Regen SmartCity (Thailand) Co., Ltd. – an electrical equipment manufacturer company and the related-software developer.
 Thai Vietjet Air – a Thai low-cost airline and an associate company of Vietnamese airline VietJet Air.
 Theerathorn Clinic – a comprehensive plastic surgery clinic based in Bangkok.
 Unilever Thai Trading Co., Ltd. – a Thai-subsidiary of the multinational manufacturer company Unilever headquartered in London.
 VR Online Innovation Co., Ltd. – an online Thai government lottery dealer.
 Yaya Skincare (Thailand) Co., Ltd. –  a cosmetic manufacturing company in Songkhla Province.
 TTC Siam Drinking Water Co., Ltd. – a mineral water manufacturer company based in Pathum Thani Province.

Results summary

Color Keys

Placements

Special awards
National awards

Host province special awards

Prizes summary

Order of Announcement

Candidates
77 contestants competed for the title of Miss Grand Thailand 2022:

Notes

References

External links 
 
 Miss Grand Thailand official website

Beauty pageants in Thailand
Miss Grand Thailand
April 2022 events in Thailand
Grand Thailand